Italy has a well developed transport infrastructure. The Italian rail network is extensive, especially in the north, and it includes a high-speed rail network that joins the major cities of Italy from Naples through northern cities such as Milan and Turin. The Florence–Rome high-speed railway was the first high-speed line opened in Europe when more than half of it opened in 1977. Italy has 2,507 people and 12.46 km2 per kilometer of rail track, giving Italy the world's 13th largest rail network. The Italian rail network is operated by state-owned Ferrovie dello Stato, while the rail tracks and infrastructure are managed by Rete Ferroviaria Italiana. 

Italy's road network is also widespread, with a total length of about 487,700 km. 
It comprises both an extensive motorway network (6,758 km), mostly toll roads, and national and local roads. Italy was the first country in the world to build motorways, the so-called autostrade, reserved for fast traffic and for motor vehicles only. The Autostrada dei Laghi  ("Lakes Motorway"), the first built in the world, connecting Milan to Lake Como and Lake Maggiore, and now parts of the A8 and A9 motorways, was devised by Piero Puricelli and was inaugurated in 1924. 

Italy is the fifth in Europe by number of passengers by air transport, with about 148 million passengers or about 10% of the European total in 2011. In 2012 there were 130 airports in Italy, including the two hubs of Malpensa International Airport in Milan and Leonardo da Vinci International Airport in Rome. Since October 2021, Italy's flag carrier airline is ITA Airways, which took over the brand, the IATA ticketing code, and many assets belonging to the former flag carrier Alitalia, after its bankruptcy.

Because of its long seacoast, Italy also has many harbors for the transportation of both goods and passengers. In 2004 there were 43 major seaports including the Port of Genoa, the country's largest and the third busiest by cargo tonnage in the Mediterranean Sea. Due to the increasing importance of the maritime Silk Road with its connections to Asia and East Africa, the Italian ports for Central and Eastern Europe have become important in recent years. In addition, the trade in goods is shifting from the European northern ports to the ports of the Mediterranean Sea due to the considerable time savings and environmental protection. In particular, the deep water port of Trieste in the northernmost part of the Mediterranean Sea is the target of Italian, Asian and European investments. Transport networks in Italy are integrated into the Trans-European Transport Networks.

Railways 

The Italian rail network is extensive, especially in the north, and it includes a high-speed rail network that joins the major cities of Italy from Naples through northern cities such as Milan and Turin. Italy has 2,507 people and 12.46 km2 per kilometer of rail track, giving Italy the world's 13th largest rail network. Italy has 11 rail border crossings over the Alpine mountains with its neighbouring countries.

Higher-speed trains are divided into three categories: Frecciarossa trains operate at a maximum speed of 300 km/h on dedicated high-speed tracks; Frecciargento trains operate at a maximum speed of 250 km/h on both high-speed and mainline tracks; and Frecciabianca trains operate on high-speed regional lines at a maximum speed of 200 km/h.

The active lines are 16,723 km. The network is recently growing with the construction of the new high-speed rail network.
The narrow gauge tracks are: 

  of  gauge (all electrified);
  of  gauge (of which  electrified).

A major part of the Italian rail network is managed and operated by Ferrovie dello Stato Italiane, a state owned company. Other regional agencies, mostly owned by public entities such as regional governments, operate on the Italian network. The rail tracks and infrastructure are managed by Rete Ferroviaria Italiana. The Italian railways are subsidised by the government, receiving €8.1 billion in 2009.

Travellers who often make use of the railway during their stay in Italy might use Rail Passes, such as the European Inter-Rail or Italy's national and regional passes. These rail passes allow travellers the freedom to use regional trains during the validity period, but all high-speed and intercity trains require a 10-euro reservation fee. Regional passes, such as "Io viaggio ovunque Lombardia", offer one-day, multiple-day and monthly period of validity. There are also saver passes for adults, who travel as a group, with savings up to 20%. Foreign travellers should purchase these passes in advance, so that the passes could be delivered by post prior to the trip. When using the rail passes, the date of travel needs to be filled in before boarding the trains.

High speed trains

Major works to increase the commercial speed of the trains already started in 1967: the Rome-Florence "super-direct" line was built for trains up to 230 km/h, and reduced the journey time to less than two hours. The Florence–Rome high-speed railway was the first high-speed line opened in Europe when more than half of it opened in 1977.

In 2009 a new high-speed line linking Milan and Turin, operating at 300 km/h, opened to passenger traffic, reducing the journey time from two hours to one hour. In the same year, the Milan-Bologna line was open, reducing the journey time to 55 minutes. Also the Bologna-Florence high-speed line was upgraded to 300 km/h for a journey time of 35 minutes.

Since then, it is possible to travel from Turin to Salerno (ca. 950 km) in less than 5 hours. More than 100 trains per day are operated.

The main public operator of high-speed trains (alta velocità AV, formerly Eurostar Italia) is Trenitalia, part of FSI. Trains are divided into three categories: Frecciarossa ("Red arrow") trains operate at a maximum of 300 km/h on dedicated high-speed tracks; Frecciargento (Silver arrow) trains operate at a maximum of 250 km/h on both high-speed and mainline tracks; Frecciabianca (White arrow) trains operate at a maximum of 200 km/h on mainline tracks only.

Since 2012, a new and Italy's first private train operator, NTV (branded as Italo), run high-speed services in competition with Trenitalia. Even nowadays, Italy is the only county in Europe with a private high-speed train operator.

Construction of the Milan-Venice high-speed line has begun in 2013 and in 2016 the Milan-Treviglio section has been opened to passenger traffic; the Milan-Genoa high-speed line (Terzo Valico dei Giovi) is also under construction.

Today it is possible to travel from Rome to Milan in less than 3 hours (2h 55') with the Frecciarossa 1000, the new high-speed train. To cover this route, there's a train every 30 minutes.

Intercity trains

With the introduction of high-speed trains, intercity trains are limited to few services per day on mainline and regional tracks.

The daytime services (Intercity IC), while not frequent and limited to one or two trains per route, are essential in providing access to cities and towns off the railway's mainline network. The main routes are Trieste to Rome (stopping at Venice, Bologna, Prato, Florence and Arezzo), Milan to Rome (stopping at Genoa, La Spezia, Pisa and Livorno / stopping at Parma, Modena, Bologna, Prato, Florence and Arezzo), Bologna to Lecce (stopping at Rimini, Ancona, Pescara, Bari and Brindisi) and Rome to Reggio di Calabria (stopping at Latina and Naples). In addition, the Intercity trains provide a more economical means of long-distance rail travel within Italy.

The night trains (Intercity Notte ICN) have sleeper compartments and washrooms, but no showers on board. Main routes are Rome to Bolzano/Bozen (calling at Florence, Bologna, Verona, Rovereto and Trento), Milan to Lecce (calling at Bologna, Rimini, Ancona, Pescara, Bari and Brindisi), Turin to Lecce (calling at Alessandria, Voghera, Piacenza, Parma, Bologna, Rimini, Pescara, Bari and Brindisi) and Reggio di Calabria to Turin (calling Naples, Rome, Livorno, La Spezia and Genova). Most portions of these ICN services run during the night; since most services take 10 to 15 hours to complete a one-way journey, their day-time portion provide extra train connections to complement with the Intercity services.

There are a total of 86 intercity trains running within Italy per day.

Regional trains

Trenitalia operates regional services (both fast veloce RGV and stopping REG) throughout Italy.

Regional train agencies exist: their train schedules are largely connected to and shown on Trenitalia, and tickets for such train services can be purchased through Trenitalia's national network. Other regional agencies have separate ticket systems which are not mutually exchangeable with that of Trenitalia. These "regional" tickets could be purchased at local newsagents or tobacco stores instead.

 Trentino-Alto Adige / Trentino-Südtirol: Südtirol Bahn (South Tyrol Railway) runs regional services on Ala/Ahl-am-Etsch to Bolzano/Bozen (calling at Rovereto/Rofreit, Trento/Trient and Mezzocorona/Kronmetz), Bolzano/Bozen to Merano/Meran, Bressanone/Brixen to San Candido/Innichen, and a direct "Tirol regional express REX" service between Bolzano/Bozen in Italy and Innsbruck in Austria.
 Veneto: Sistemi Territoriali runs regional trains in Veneto region.
 Lombardy: Trenord runs the Malpensa Express airport train, many Milan's suburban lines and most regional train services in Lombardy. Trenord also co-operates with DB and ÖBB on the EuroCity Verona-Munich service, and with SBB CFF FFS (joint-venture TiLo) on the regional Milan-Bellinzona service.
 Emilia-Romagna: Trasporto Passeggeri Emilia-Romagna provides vital connections across cities on different mainline networks, including Modena, Parma, Suzzara, Ferrara, Reggio Emilia and Bologna.
 Tuscany: La Ferroviaria Italiana operates in Arezzo province.
 Abruzzo: Sangritana runs daily services between Pescara and Lanciano.

In addition to these agencies, there's a great deal of other little operators, such as AMT Genova for the Genova-Casella railway.

Rapid transit

7 cities have metro systems:

15 cities have commuter rail systems; cities without wikilink are those listed just above for their metro rail system.
 Bari (Bari metropolitan railway service, 3 lines)
 Bologna (Bologna metropolitan railway service, 8 lines)
 Cagliari, 1 line
 Catanzaro, 2 lines
 Genoa (Genoa urban railway service, 3 lines)
 Messina, 1 line
 Milan (Milan suburban railway service, 12 lines)
 Naples, 8 lines
 Palermo (Palermo metropolitan railway service, 2 lines)
 Perugia, 1 line
 Potenza, 1 line
 Reggio Calabria, 1 line
 Rome (FL lines, 8 lines)
 Salerno (Salerno metropolitan railway service, 1 line)
 Turin (Turin metropolitan railway service, 8 lines)

Rail links with adjacent countries 

Italy has 11 rail border crossings over the Alpine mountains with her neighbouring countries: six are designated as mainline tracks and two are metre-gauge tracks. The six mainline border crossings are: two with France (one for Nice and Marseille; the other for Lyon and Dijon), two with Switzerland (one for Brig, Bern and Geneva; the other for Chiasso, Lugano, Lucerne and Zürich), and two with Austria (one for Innsbruck; the other for Villach, Graz and Vienna). The two-metre-gauge track crossings are located at the border town of Tirano (enters Switzerland's Canton Graubünden/Grisons) and Domodossola (enters Switzerland's Locarno).

There is a railway line connecting Italy's northeastern port of Trieste to Slovenia, but no passenger or freight services operate on this track. Consequently, there is no direct connections between Trieste and Ljubljana, the capital of Slovenia, despite the proximity of both cities.

 Italy-France: Marseille-Ventimiglia railway, currently EuroCity trains of Thello Milan-Marseille and one EuroNight train of RZD Moscow-Nice.
 Italy-France: Fréjus Rail Tunnel at 1,338 m above sea, currently SNCF TGV trains Milan-Paris and Turin-Paris and EuroNight trains of Thello Venice-Paris
 Italy-Switzerland: Domodossola–Locarno railway metre-gauge trains
 Italy-Switzerland: Simplon Tunnel, currently EuroCity trains of SBB CFF FFS Milan-Geneva and Milan-Bern
 Italy-Switzerland: connecting Varese (Italy) to Bellinzona (Switzerland) and runs on the eastern coast of Lake Maggiore
 Italy-Switzerland: Milan–Chiasso railway, currently EuroCity trains of SBB CFF FFS Milan-Zürich
 Italy-Switzerland: Bernina railway at 2,253 m above sea, metre-gauge trains of RhB Tirano-St. Moritz and the Bernina Express tourist train
 Italy-Austria: Brenner railway at 1,371 m above sea, currently EuroCity trains of ÖBB-DB Munich-Verona and Munich-Venice/Bologna, and DB CityNightLine Munich-Rome/Milan
 Italy-Austria: at 1,175 m above sea connecting San Candido/Innichen (Italy) and Lienz (Austria)
 Italy-Austria: connecting Venice and Udine (Italy) to Villach (Austria), currently EuroCity trains of ÖBB Venice-Vienna, EuroNight trains of ÖBB Vienna-Rome/Milan, and DB CityNightLine Munich-Venice
 Italy-Slovenia: Tarvisio–Ljubljana Railway

The Vatican City is also linked to Italy with a railway line serving a single railway station, the Vatican City railway station. This line is used only for special occasions.
San Marino used to have a narrow gauge rail connection with Italy; this was dismantled in 1944.

Stations

Italy's top ten railway stations by annual passengers are:

Roads 

Italy is one of the countries with the most vehicles per capita, with 690 per 1000 people in 2010. The speed limit in towns is usually  and less commonly .

Italy was the first country in the world to build motorways, the so-called autostrade, reserved for fast traffic and for motor vehicles only. The Autostrada dei Laghi  ("Lakes Motorway"), the first built in the world, connecting Milan to Lake Como and Lake Maggiore, and now parts of the A8 and A9 motorways, was devised by Piero Puricelli and was inaugurated in 1924.

Waterways 
Italy has  of navigable waterways for various types of commercial traffic, although of limited overall value.

In the northern regions of Lombardy and Venetia, commuter ferry boats operate on Lake Garda and Lake Como to connect towns and villages at both sides of the lakes. The waterways in Venice, including the Grand Canal, serve as the vital transportation network for local residents and tourists. Frequent shuttle ferries (vaporetta) connect different points on the main island of Venice and other outlying islands of the lagoon. In addition, there are direct shuttle boats between Venice and the Venice Marco Polo Airport.

Ports and harbours 

Italy has been the final destination of the Silk Road for many centuries. In particular, the construction of the Suez Canal intensified sea trade with East Africa and Asia from the 19th century. Since the end of the Cold War and increasing European integration, the trade relations, which were often interrupted in the 20th century, have intensified again. Because of its long seacoast, Italy also has many harbors for the transportation of both goods and passengers. In 2004 there were 43 major seaports including the Port of Genoa, the country's largest and the third busiest by cargo tonnage in the Mediterranean Sea. 

Due to the increasing importance of the maritime Silk Road with its connections to Asia and East Africa, the Italian ports for Central and Eastern Europe have become important in recent years. In addition, the trade in goods is shifting from the European northern ports to the ports of the Mediterranean Sea due to the considerable time savings and environmental protection. In particular, the deep water port of Trieste in the northernmost part of the Mediterranean Sea is the target of Italian, Asian and European investments.

Air transport

Airlines 

Since October 2021, Italy's flag carrier airline is ITA Airways, which took over the brand, the IATA ticketing code, and many assets belonging to the former flag carrier Alitalia, after its bankruptcy. ITA Airways serves 44 destinations and also operates the former Alitalia regional subsidiary, Alitalia CityLiner. 

The country also has regional airlines (such as Air Dolomiti), low-cost carriers, and Charter and leisure carriers (including Neos, Blue Panorama Airlines and Poste Air Cargo). Major Italian cargo operators are ITA Airways Cargo and Cargolux Italia. In 2012 there were 130 airports in Italy, including the two hubs of Malpensa International Airport in Milan and Leonardo da Vinci International Airport in Rome.

Airports

Italy is the fifth in Europe by number of passengers by air transport, with about 148 million passengers or about 10% of the European total in 2011. Most of passengers in Italy are on international flights (57%). A big share of domestic flights connect the major islands (Sardinia and Sicily) to the mainland. Domestic flights between major Italian cities as Rome and Milan still play a relevant role but are declining since the opening of the Italian high-speed rail network in recent years.

Italy has a total as of 130 airports in 2012, of which 99 have paved runways:
over 3,047 m: 9
2,438 to 3,047 m: 31
1,524 to 2,437 m: 18
914 to 1,523 m: 29
under 914 m: 12

Airports - with unpaved runways in 2012:
total: 31
1,524 to 2,437 m: 1
914 to 1,523 m: 11
under 914 m: 19

Busiest airports

This is a list of the top ten busiest airports in Italy in 2017.

Bus

There are long-distance intercity buses run by local companies, but the services are infrequent during the week and usually provide a secondary link to railway services.

Italy does not have a nationwide coach operator. However, in 2015, the British company Megabus (Europe) launched daily intercity bus services on several domestic routes

This makes a daily total of 12 services in each direction between Rome and Bologna.

Flixbus, a company founded in the course of the opening of the German intercity bus market also serves routes in Italy both domestic and international.

Airport shuttle

Airport shuttle buses, however, are highly developed and convenient for rail travellers. Most airports in Italy are not connected to the railway network, except for Rome Fiumicino Airport, Milan Malpensa Airport and Turin Caselle Airport. In Bologna, a light-rail track has been constructed and inaugurated in November 2020, connecting Bologna Airport to the main railway station, while Line 1 of Naples Metro is set to finally reach Capodichino Airport and connect it to the central station and the city center in 2024.

 Venice: Venezia-Mestre station - Marco Polo Airport (50 minutes) and Treviso Airport
 Milan: Milano Centrale station - Malpensa Airport (1 hour 5 minutes), Linate Airport (35 minutes) and Milan Bergamo Airport (1 hour)
 Brescia: Brescia station - Milan Bergamo Airport (1 hour)
 Rome: Rome Termini station - Fiumicino Airport by train
 Verona: Verona Porta Nuova station - Villafranca "Catullo" Airport (20 minutes)
 Bologna: Centrale station - Bologna Airport (20 minutes) - Route modified in November 2020. It shifted from route BLQ (Bologna Centrale Station-Bologna Airport) to route 944 Ospedale Maggiore-Bologna Airport
 Pescara Centrale station - Abruzzo Airport (10 minutes)
 Florence: Firenze S M Novella station - Florence Airport

Local bus

Local buses are usually divided into urban (urbano) and suburban (interurbano or extraurbano) lines.

See also

 Economy of Italy
 History of Italy
 Plug-in electric vehicles in Italy
 Renewable energy in Italy
 Tourism in Italy

References

External links